Keene is a city in Johnson County, Texas, United States. The population was 6,387 in 2020.

Geography

Keene is located in central Johnson County at  (32.392860, –97.327501). It is bordered to the west by Cleburne, the county seat. U.S. Route 67 runs through the southern side of the city, leading east  to Alvarado and west  to Cleburne.

Keene sits on a regional watershed divide, with the northern and eastern sides of the city draining to Turkey Creek, part of the Trinity River watershed, and the southern and western sides draining to East Buffalo Creek, part of the Brazos River watershed.

Demographics

As of the census of 2010, there were 6,106 people, 1,923 households, and 1,417 families residing in the city. The population density was 1,238.5 people per square mile (478.7/km). There were 2,204 housing units, of which 281 units, or 12.7%, were vacant. As of the 2020 United States census, there were 6,387 people, 1,972 households, and 1,470 families residing in the city.

In 2010, the racial makeup of the city was 71.2% white, 6.1% African American, 0.9% Native American, 2.5% Asian, 5.3% Pacific Islander, 11.0% some other race, and 2.8% from two or more races. Hispanic or Latino people of any race were 30.3% of the population. In 2020, the racial makeup was 48.96% white, 4.13% African American, 0.3% Native American, 1.69% Asian, 6.86% Pacific Islander, 0.92% some other race, 4.81% multiracial, and 32.33% Hispanic or Latino of any race.

Of the 1,923 households in 2010, 41.8% had children under the age of 18 living with them, 52.5% were headed by married couples living together, 15.2% had a female householder with no husband present, and 26.3% were non-families. 20.5% of all households were made up of individuals, and 7.6% were someone living alone who was 65 years of age or older. The average household size was 2.97, and the average family size was 3.37.

27.6% of the city's population were under the age of 18, 14.9% were from 18 to 24, 26.8% from 25 to 44, 24.6% were from 45 to 64, and 13.1% were 65 years of age or older. The median age was 30.4 years. For every 100 females, there were 91.5 males. For every 100 females age 18 and over, there were 86.5 males.

For the period 2013–2017, the estimated median annual income for a household in the city was $41,869, and the median income for a family was $52,713. Male full-time workers had a median income of $45,345 versus $34,338 for females. The per capita income for the city was $18,066. About 14.9% of families and 17.0% of the total population were below the poverty line, including 20.6% of those under age 18 and 16.3% of those age 65 or over.

Media
In addition to the Dallas-Fort Worth media, news related to the city of Keene is covered by the Keene Star and Cleburne Times-Review. The latter newspaper covers Johnson and Somervell counties.

Radio stations include KHFX, which has a country music format, and KJRN, the listener-supported, Christian radio station of Southwestern Adventist University.

Education 

The Keene Independent School District provides public education to the area. It includes Keene Elementary School, Keene Junior High, and Keene High School.

There are two private schools in the city, Keene Adventist Elementary School (grades K–8), and Chisholm Trail Academy (grades 9–12). Both schools, along with Southwestern Adventist University (a private liberal arts university in Keene which is currently the only four-year institution of higher learning in Johnson County), are affiliated with the Seventh-day Adventist Church.

Parks
Elisa Carver Park is located in the heart of Keene and includes softball, soccer and tee ball fields, volleyball and basketball courts, walking trail, playground, picnic area, and nine-hole disc golf course. There is also a park by the privately run Keene Adventist Elementary School.

Sports 
Keene is home to semi-professional soccer club Keene FC, who play in the United Premier Soccer League, the fourth division of soccer in the U.S.

References

External links
 City of Keene official website
 Keene Chamber of Commerce

Dallas–Fort Worth metroplex
Cities in Texas
Cities in Johnson County, Texas